The Lighthouse of Ponta de Sagres, is beacon/lighthouse located along the coastal peninsula of Sagres Point in the civil parish of Sagres, in the Portuguese municipality of the Vila do Bispo.

History

As part of the 5th centenary commemorations marking the birth of Henry the Navigator, in 1894 the lighthouse was inaugurated.

On 28 November 1906, the 5th order diopter lamp was substituted by an optical device of greater range. This lantern was lit on 23 June 1923, following the construction of a new building with the installation of a 4th order catadioptric optical lamp, that was originally installed in the lighthouse of Ponta da Piedade. 

Between 1947-1949, the lighthouse was transferred to the Ministry of the Navy. 

The illumination source was changed to an electric incandescent lamp following the installation of power generators. 

In 1958, it was decided to demolish the building, due to its historic inadequacy, and a new structure was constructed  from the old building.  Budgeted at 146.890$00 escudos (733.00 euros), the new lighthouse was inaugurated on 1 April 1960.

The lighthouse was automatized in 1979.  

In August 1983, the lighthouse began to be controlled from a distance, from the Cape St. Vincent Lighthouse, and integrated into the special protection zone of the fortress of Sagres.

Architecture
The lamp is characterized by a luminous red beacon that flashes at a two-second interval. The rotation of the optical beacon is produced from clock mechanism.

See also

 List of lighthouses in Portugal

References

Notes

Sources
 
 
 
 
 

Ponta Sagres
Buildings and structures in the Algarve